A world war is an international conflict which involves all or most of the world's major powers. Conventionally, the term is reserved for two major international conflicts that occurred during the first half of the 20th century, World WarI (1914–1918) and World WarII (1939–1945), although historians have also described other global conflicts as world wars, such as the Nine Years' War, the War of the Spanish Succession, the Seven Years' War, the French Revolutionary and Napoleonic Wars, the Cold War, and the War on Terror.

Etymology 
The Oxford English Dictionary cited the first known usage in the English language to a Scottish newspaper, The People's Journal, in 1848: "A war among the great powers is now necessarily a world-war." The term "world war" is used by Karl Marx and his associate, Friedrich Engels, in a series of articles published around 1850 called The Class Struggles in France. Rasmus B. Anderson in 1889 described an episode in Teutonic mythology as a "world war" (Swedish: världskrig), justifying this description by a line in an Old Norse epic poem, "Völuspá: folcvig fyrst I heimi" ("The first great war in the world".) German writer August Wilhelm Otto Niemann had used the term "world war" in the title of his anti-British novel, Der Weltkrieg: Deutsche Träume (The World War: German Dreams) in 1904, published in English as The Coming Conquest of England.

The term "first world war" was first used in September 1914 by German biologist and philosopher Ernst Haeckel, who claimed that "there is no doubt that the course and character of the feared 'European War' ... will become the first world war in the full sense of the word", citing a wire service report in The Indianapolis Star on 20 September 1914. In English, the term "First World War" had been used by Lt-Col. Charles à Court Repington, as a title for his memoirs (published in 1920); he had noted his discussion on the matter with a Major Johnstone of Harvard University in his diary entry of September 10, 1918.

The term "World War I" was coined by Time magazine on page 28b of its June 12, 1939 issue. In the same article, on page 32, the term "World WarII" was first used speculatively to describe the upcoming war. The first use for the actual war came in its issue of September 11, 1939. One week earlier, on September 4, the day after France and the United Kingdom declared war on Germany, the Danish newspaper Kristeligt Dagblad used the term on its front page, saying "The Second World War broke out yesterday at 11 a.m."

Speculative fiction authors had been noting the concept of a Second World War in 1919 and 1920, when Milo Hastings wrote his dystopian novel, City of Endless Night.

History

First World War

World War I occurred from 1914 to 1918. In terms of human technological history, the scale of World WarI was enabled by the technological advances of the second industrial revolution and the resulting globalization that allowed global power projection and mass production of military hardware. It had been recognized that the complex system of opposing military alliances (the German and Austro-Hungarian Empires against the British, Russian, and French Empires) was likely, if war broke out, to lead to a worldwide conflict. That caused a very minute conflict between two countries to have the potential to set off a domino effect of alliances, triggering a world war. The fact that the powers involved had large overseas empires virtually guaranteed that such a war would be worldwide, as the colonies' resources would be a crucial strategic factor. The same strategic considerations also ensured that the combatants would strike at each other's colonies, thus spreading the wars far more widely than those of pre-Columbian times. 

War crimes were perpetrated in World War I. Chemical weapons were used in the war despite the Hague Conventions of 1899 and 1907 having outlawed the use of such weapons in warfare. The Ottoman Empire was responsible for the Armenian genocide, during the First World War, as well as other war crimes.

Second World War

The Second World War occurred from 1939 to 1945 and is the only conflict in which nuclear weapons have been used; both Hiroshima and Nagasaki, in the Japanese Empire, were devastated by atomic bombs dropped by the United States. Nazi Germany, led by Adolf Hitler, was responsible for genocides, most notably the Holocaust, the killing of about 6,000,000 Jews and 11,000,000 others persecuted by the Nazis, including Romani people and homosexuals. The United States, the Soviet Union, and Canada deported and interned minority groups within their own borders and, largely because of the conflict, many ethnic Germans were later expelled from Eastern Europe. Japan was responsible for attacking neutral nations without a declaration of war, such as the attack on Pearl Harbor. It is also known for its brutal treatment and killing of Allied prisoners of war and the inhabitants of Asia. It also used Asians as forced laborers and was responsible for the Nanking massacre in which 250,000 civilians were brutally murdered by Japanese troops. Noncombatants suffered at least as badly as or worse than combatants, and the distinction between combatants and noncombatants was often blurred by the belligerents of total war in both conflicts.

The outcome of the war had a profound effect on the course of world history. The old European empires collapsed or were dismantled as a direct result of the wars' crushing costs and, in some cases, their fall was caused by the defeat of imperial powers. The United States became firmly established as the dominant global superpower, along with its ideological foe, the Soviet Union, in close competition. The two superpowers exerted political influence over most of the world's nation-states for decades after the end of the Second World War. The modern international security, economic, and diplomatic system was created in the aftermath of the war.

Institutions such as the United Nations were established to collectivize international affairs, with the explicit goal of preventing another outbreak of general war. The wars had also greatly changed the course of daily life. Technologies developed during wartime had a profound effect on peacetime life as well, such as by advances in jet aircraft, penicillin, nuclear energy, and electronic computers.

Potential Third World War

Since the atomic bombings of Hiroshima and Nagasaki during the Second World War, there has been a widespread and prolonged fear of a potential third World War between nuclear-armed powers. It is often suggested that it would become a nuclear war, and be more devastating and violent than both the First and Second World Wars. Albert Einstein is often quoted as having said in 1947 that "I know not with what weapons World WarIII will be fought, but World WarIV will be fought with sticks and stones." It has been anticipated and planned for by military and civil authorities, and it has also been explored in fiction in many countries. Scenarios have ranged from conventional warfare to limited or total nuclear warfare.

Various former government officials, politicians, authors, and military leaders (including James Woolsey, Alexandre de Marenches, Eliot Cohen, and Subcomandante Marcos) have attempted to apply the labels of the "Third World War" and the "Fourth World War" to various past and present global wars since the end of the Second World War, such as the Cold War and the War on Terror respectively. However, none of the wars have commonly been deemed world wars.

During the early-21st century, the war in Afghanistan (2001–2021), the Arab Spring (2010–2012), the Syrian civil war (2011–present), the war in Iraq (2013–2017), the Russo-Ukrainian War (2014–present), the Yemeni Civil War (2014–present), the 2022 Kazakh unrest and their worldwide spillovers are sometimes described as proxy wars waged by the United States and Russia, which led some commentators to characterize the situation as a "proto-world war" with many countries embroiled in overlapping conflicts.

Other global conflicts 

The Late Bronze Age collapse has been described as "World War Zero" by some historians.

Some historians consider the Seven Years' War (1756–1763) to have been a world war.  Historians Richard F. Hamilton and Holger H. Herwig include it among a list of eight world wars, including the two generally agreed upon world wars plus these six others:  the Nine Years' War (1689–1697), the War of the Spanish Succession (1701–1714), the War of the Austrian Succession (1740–1748), the Seven Years' War, the French Revolutionary Wars (1792–1802), and the Napoleonic Wars (1803–1815).  British historian John Robert Seeley dubbed all of those wars between France and Great Britain (later the UK) between 1689 and 1815 (including the American Revolutionary War from 1775–1783) as the Second Hundred Years' War, echoing an earlier period of conflict between France and England known as the Hundred Years' War (1337–1453).  Although that period included the War of the Quadruple Alliance (1718–1720) in which France and Great Britain were on the same side.  Some writers have referred to the American Revolutionary War alone as a world war.

Other possible example is the Second Congo War (1998–2003) that involved nine nations and led to ongoing low-intensity warfare despite an official peace and the first democratic elections in 2006. It has frequently been referred to as "Africa's World War", even though it was only waged on one continent.

See also 

 Neocolonialism
 New Imperialism
 Revolutionary wave
 List of largest empires
 First wave of European colonization
 List of military conflicts spanning multiple wars
 List of wars and anthropogenic disasters by death toll
 Political history of the world

References

External links 

 This is the Fourth World War, an interview with philosopher Jean Baudrillard

War
World
Wars by type